Stanton Judkins Peelle (February 11, 1843 – September 4, 1928) was an American politician and judge who served as a United States representative from Indiana and both an associate judge judge and chief justice of the Court of Claims.

Education and career

Born on February 11, 1843, in Richmond, Wayne County, Indiana, Peelle attended the common schools and Winchester Seminary in Indiana, then attended Northern Indiana Normal School (now Valparaiso University). He enlisted in Company G, Eighth Regiment, Indiana Volunteers on August 5, 1861 and served until near the close of the American Civil War, as a corporal and second lieutenant. He read law with William A. Peelle in Centerville, Indiana in 1866. He entered private practice in Winchester, Indiana from 1866 to 1869. He continued private practice in Indianapolis, Indiana from 1869 to 1892 (a notable partner at his Indianapolis firm was William L. Taylor, who would later become Indiana Attorney General). He was an assistant district attorney for Marion County, Indiana from 1872 to 1873. He was a member of the Indiana House of Representatives from 1878 to 1879.

Congressional service

Peelle was elected as a Republican from Indiana's 7th congressional district to the United States House of Representatives of the 47th United States Congress, serving from March 4, 1881, to March 3, 1883. He presented credentials as a member-elect to the 48th United States Congress and served from March 4, 1883, to May 22, 1884, when he was succeeded by United States Representative William E. English, who contested his election. He was a delegate to the 1892 Republican National Convention.

Federal judicial service

Peelle was nominated by President Benjamin Harrison on March 24, 1892, to a judgeship on the Court of Claims (later the United States Court of Claims) vacated by Judge Glenni William Scofield. He was confirmed by the United States Senate on March 28, 1892, and received his commission the same day. His service terminated on January 2, 1906, due to his elevation to be Chief Justice of the same court.

Peelle was nominated by President Theodore Roosevelt on December 19, 1905, to the Chief Justice seat on the Court of Claims vacated by Chief Justice Charles C. Nott. He was confirmed by the Senate on December 20, 1905, and received his commission the same day. His service terminated on February 11, 1913, due to his resignation.

Other service

Concurrent with his federal judicial service, Peelle served as a Professor of Law for George Washington University Law School from 1901 to 1911. He served as a member of the Board of Trustees of Howard University in Washington, D.C. from 1906 to 1925. He was President of the Board of Trustees of Washington College of Law (then an independent law school) from 1910 to 1925.

Death

Peelle died on September 4, 1928, in Washington, D.C., where he resided. He was interred in Rock Creek Cemetery in Washington, D.C.

References

Sources

External links
Men of Mark in America Biography

1843 births
1928 deaths
Members of the Indiana House of Representatives
Judges of the United States Court of Claims
People from Richmond, Indiana
United States Article I federal judges appointed by Benjamin Harrison
19th-century American judges
People from Winchester, Indiana
George Washington University Law School faculty
Washington, D.C., Republicans
Republican Party members of the United States House of Representatives from Indiana